The men's volleyball tournament at the 2017 Southeast Asian Games will be held in Kuala Lumpur, Malaysia at the Malaysia International Trade & Exhibition Centre.

Draw

Participating nations

Source: Volleyverse

Results
All times are Malaysia Standard Time (UTC+8)

Preliminary round

Group A

Group B

Final round

Semifinals

Bronze-medal match

Gold-medal match

Final standings
9.3 Classification of Teams and Teams’ Ranking
System
9.3.1 In order to establish the ranking of teams
after the round-robin competition, the
following criteria shall be implemented for
all competition:
(i) By the number of victories (matches
won, matches lost) among teams of
the same group. Teams that won more
matches will get better ranking. 
Technical Handbook: Volleyball
V9: 17.04.2017
18
(ii) If there is an equal number of
victories, then the following criteria
shall be applied:
ß Number of points gained: If two
(2) or more teams have the same
number of victories (matches
won, matches lost), they shall be
classified in descending order
by the points gained by each
team per match

See also
Women's tournament

References

http://www.kualalumpur2017.com.my/noc-relation/17-V9_Volleyball.pdf

Women